Kakaravai is a village in Krishna district of the Indian state of Andhra Pradesh. It is located in Vatsavai mandal of Vijayawada revenue division.

References
 India census, Kakaravai had a population of 1856. Males and females both constitute 50% of the population. Kakaravai has an average literacy rate of 59%, lower than the national average of 74%. Male literacy is 54% and female literacy is 45%. In Kakaravai, 10.72% of the population is under 6 years of age. Total Households in Kakaravai are 557.

See also 
List of villages in Krishna district

References 

Villages in Krishna district
Mandal headquarters in Krishna district